The government of El Salvador is a presidential representative democratic republic.

El Salvador elects its head of state – the President of El Salvador –  directly through a fixed-date general election whose winner is decided by absolute majority.  If an absolute majority (50% + 1) is not achieved by any candidate in the first round of a presidential election, then a run-off election is conducted 30 days later between the two candidates who obtained the most votes in the first round. The presidential period is five years. Consecutive re-election is not permitted, though previously elected presidents may run for a second, non-consecutive term.

Salvadorans also elect a single-chamber, unicameral national legislature – the Legislative Assembly of El Salvador – composed of 84 members (deputies). They are elected by open-list proportional representation for three-year terms, with the possibility of immediate re-election. All 84 seats in the Legislative Assembly are elected on the basis of 14 multi-member constituencies (corresponding to El Salvador's 14 departments). They range from 3-16 seats each according to department population size.

Political culture 

El Salvador has a multi-party system. Two political parties, the Nationalist Republican Alliance (ARENA) and the Farabundo Martí National Liberation Front (FMLN) have tended to dominate elections. ARENA candidates won four consecutive presidential elections until the election of Mauricio Funes of the FMLN in March 2009.

Geographically, the departments of the Central region, especially the capital and the coastal regions, known as departamentos rojos, or red departments, are relatively Leftist. The departamentos azules, or blue departments in the east, western and highland regions are relatively conservative.

In February 2021, El Salvador's legislative election was an important breakthrough. The new party, founded by President Nayib Bukele, Nuevas Ideas, won around two-thirds of votes with its allies (GANA-New Ideas). His party won supermajority 56 seats in the 84-seat parliament. Bukele became the country’s most powerful leader in three decades.

Schedule

Election

List of elections

See also 

 Politics of El Salvador

References